The  or VSE (Vault Super Express) is an electric multiple unit (EMU) train operated by Odakyu Electric Railway on Romancecar services in Japan. Two 10-car articulated sets were introduced in March 2005, manufactured by Nippon Sharyo.

The type won a Japanese Good Design Award in 2005, and a Blue Ribbon Award in 2006.

On 11 March 2022, the train type was withdrawn from regular service, and has since been reserved for use on special services only. A complete retirement is planned for 2023.

Design
The 50000 series was designed by architect Noriaki Okabe. Body construction is of double-skin aluminium.

The 50000 series has regenerative brakes, and is equipped with air suspension, and tilts for passenger comfort.

As with most previous Romancecar trains, the train cars in the sets are articulated.

Interior 
The seats are rotated five degrees toward the windows. In the leading cars, the frontmost seats can be arranged in a longitudinal, lounge-like configuration. Car 3 uses compartment-style seating.

The 50000 series trains have the driver's cab located above the passenger saloon, giving passengers a view out of the front of the train. This arrangement was used on earlier Odakyu Romancecar trains, although discontinued with the 30000 series EXE trains.

Formation 
The sets are formed as follows.

 The leading cars have observation decks.
 Cars 3 and 8 are equipped with cafeterias and lavatories.
 Car 3 has a wheelchair space, and features slightly wider sliding doors.

History
The first set was delivered from Nippon Sharyo in November 2004, and entered service on 19 March 2005.

Withdrawal 
Odakyu initially planned to refurbish the 50000 series trains. However, as a result of the train type's overall difficulty to repair and advanced technology required to do so, Odakyu announced on 17 December 2021 its decision to retire them. On 29 January 2022, set 50002 was adorned with decorations to commemorate the type's withdrawal. 

The trains were relegated from regular service to special service only on 11 March 2022, and are planned to be completely retired in 2023.

References

External links

 Odakyu Romancecar Lineup 

Electric multiple units of Japan
50000 series VSE
Tilting trains
Train-related introductions in 2005
Articulated passenger trains
Nippon Sharyo multiple units
1500 V DC multiple units of Japan